Chaparral Middle School could refer to

Chaparral Middle School (Diamond Bar, California)
Chaparral Middle School (Moorpark, California)